Cam M. Gambolati (born September 29, 1949, in Manchester, Connecticut) is an American Thoroughbred racehorse trainer best known for winning the 1985 Kentucky Derby with Spend A Buck.

Gambolati worked as a Laundromat operator and as a statistician for the Tampa Bay Buccaneers of the National Football League. He has had a long association with racehorse owner and University of Louisville basketball coach Rick Pitino who heads a racing partnership competing as the Ol Memorial Stable.

References 

1949 births
Living people
American racehorse trainers
Sportspeople from Manchester, Connecticut